Hans-Jürgen Wittkamp (born 23 July 1947) is a German former football player. He spent 11 seasons in the Bundesliga with FC Schalke 04 and Borussia Mönchengladbach.

External links
 

German footballers
FC Schalke 04 players
Sportspeople from Gelsenkirchen
Borussia Mönchengladbach players
Bundesliga players
1947 births
Living people
SpVgg Erkenschwick players
UEFA Cup winning players
Association football midfielders
Footballers from North Rhine-Westphalia
West German footballers